Hasan Pourshirazi (born 1957) is an Iranian television and film actor. He's best known for his acting in Mum's Guest, Santouri and Nargess.

Filmography 
2020 180° Rule
2020 Slaughterhouse
2019 Oath
2018 The Last Fiction 
2015 Loneliness of Leila (TV Series) 
2015 Kimia
 2014 Hussein Who Said No
 2013 Good to Be Back
 2013 Gonjeshkak -e Ashimashi 
 2011  Goodbye
 2010 Mokhtarnameh (TV Series) 
 2009 A Man Who Ate His Cherries 
 2009 The White Meadows 
 2008 A Simple Mistake (TV Movie) 
 2008 Nardebam-e Aseman
 2007 Santoori 
 2006 Half Moon
 2006 Nargess (TV series)
 2006 Be ahestegi... 
 2004 Mum's Guest
 2002 Under the City's Skin (TV series) 
 2001 Mosafere rey 
 2001 Killing Mad Dogs 
 1995 Conversation (TV Movie) 
 1989 Barbershop Ziba (TV Series) 
 1985 The Queue

Notes

External links
 
 Hasan Pourshirazi in Internet database of Soureh Cinema

1957 births
Living people
People from Shiraz
Iranian male film actors
Iranian television directors
Iranian male television actors